Vincent Jay (born 18 May 1985) is a former French biathlete and non-commissioned officer. During his career, he won two Olympic medals at the 2010 Winter Olympics in Vancouver - a gold in the sprint and a bronze medal in the pursuit. He was the first Frenchman to win an Olympic sprint Biathlon title. In the World Cup, he has fourteen podiums with two individual victories in Vancouver and two victories as part of relay teams.

Career
He won a gold medal in the 10 km sprint and a Bronze medal in the 12.5 km pursuit at the 2010 Winter Olympics in Vancouver, British Columbia, Canada. Jay also won the 20 km individual race at the 2009 World Cup event in Vancouver.

His Olympic victory came one year after his first victory in World Cup at the same venue. He was not considered a favourite to win gold but was seen as the fourth man in the French team after Vincent Defrasne, and Simon and Martin Fourcade. He caused  surprise by winning France's first gold medal at the 2010 Olympic Games. He followed this up with a bronze medal in the pursuit two days later. This event gave him a level of fame in the media for which he wasn't prepared. After two seasons in halftone, he announced his retirement from the sport because of disappointing results in December 2012. In his last race he helped the French team to a second place in a World Cup relay in Hochfilzen.

Jay married alpine skier Marie Marchand-Arvier in June 2014.

Following his retirement, Jay was appointed as the director of the Sports Club of Val d'Isere in July 2014.

Biathlon results
All results are sourced from the International Biathlon Union.

Olympic Games
2 medals (1 gold, 1 bronze)

*Mass start was added as an event in 2006.

World Championships

*During Olympic seasons competitions are only held for those events not included in the Olympic program.

Individual victories
2 victories (1 In, 1 Sp)

*Results are from UIPMB and IBU races which include the Biathlon World Cup, Biathlon World Championships and the Winter Olympic Games.

References

External links
 

1985 births
Living people
Sportspeople from Albertville
French male biathletes
Biathletes at the 2010 Winter Olympics
Olympic biathletes of France
Medalists at the 2010 Winter Olympics
Olympic medalists in biathlon
Olympic bronze medalists for France
Olympic gold medalists for France
Université Savoie-Mont Blanc alumni
Chevaliers of the Légion d'honneur